Apantesis phyllira, the phyllira tiger moth, is a moth of the family Erebidae. It was described by Dru Drury in 1773. It is found in North America from Quebec and New England south to Florida and west to Texas, Colorado and Alberta. The habitat consists of dry, open woodland and grassland. The species is listed as endangered in Connecticut.

The forewings are about 17 mm long. The forewings are dark brown to black dorsally with creamy-buff to pinkish-buff bands. The hindwings are pink to orange pink. Adults are on wing from March to October in two or possibly three generations in the southern United States. There are two generations up to New York and southern Ontario with adults on wing from May to June and again from August to September. In the prairie provinces and central Ontario, there seems to be only one generation, with adults on wing in mid-July.

The larvae feed on various low-growing plants, including corn, lupine and tobacco.

This species was formerly a member of the genus Grammia, but was moved to Apantesis along with the other species of the genera Grammia, Holarctia, and Notarctia.

References

 

Arctiina
Moths described in 1773
Taxa named by Dru Drury